S. K. Malik (born 1930) was a soldier and officer of the Pakistan Army (Brigadier General, later Major General). He was a protege of General Muhammed Zia-ul-Haq (1924-1988), the chief of staff of the Pakistan Army, who ruled Pakistan between 1977 and 1988. S. K. Malik wrote works such as The Quranic Concept of Power and The Quranic Concept of War. For the latter work, Zia-ul-Haq wrote the Foreword and Allah Buksh K. Brohi wrote the preface.

Works
The Quranic Concept of Power
 The Quranic Concept of War
Khalid bin Walid: the general of Islam; a study in Khalid's generalship

Further reading
    Joseph C. Myers: "The Quranic Concept of War." In: Joseph Morrison Skelly: Political Islam from Muhammad to Ahmadinejad : defenders, detractors, and definitions. Santa Barbara, Calif.
    Swati Parasha: Terrorism in Southeast Asia: Implications for South Asia. 2005

References

1930 births
Pakistan Army officers
Pakistani military writers
Living people